Juan Poll (17 March 1927 – 13 June 2001) was a Spanish alpine skier. He competed at the 1948 Winter Olympics and the 1952 Winter Olympics.

References

1927 births
2001 deaths
Spanish male alpine skiers
Olympic alpine skiers of Spain
Alpine skiers at the 1948 Winter Olympics
Alpine skiers at the 1952 Winter Olympics
Sportspeople from Barcelona
20th-century Spanish people